Ubaté may refer to:

 Ubaté, municipality of Cundinamarca, Colombia
 Ubaté Province, province of which Ubaté is the capital
 Ubaté River, river flowing in this area
 Chiquinquirá-Ubaté Valley, valley of Ubaté on the Altiplano Cundiboyacense

Muysccubun